Mej may refer to:
Mej, Sabzevar, Razavi Khorasan Province, Iran
Mej, Torqabeh and Shandiz, Razavi Khorasan Province, Iran
Mej River

See also
MEJ